The 2022 Russian invasion of Ukraine has led to serious long-term environmental consequences that threaten both environment and human health.
 
The explosions inflict toxic damage along with physical destructions. After every explosion particles of toxic substances such as lead, mercury, depleted uranium, and many more, are released into air, water, and soils. Entering human bodies, explosives like TNT, DNT, and RDX, cause malfunction of all organs and systems.
 
Fights in heavily industrialised areas lead to technological disasters, such as spills of tailings and fuel, that poison vast territories not only in Ukraine, but also in Europe and Russia. Destroyed buildings release cancerogenic dust for decades. Heavy metals and chemicals penetrate underground waters and poison water sources, killing all life in rivers and water bodies. Destruction of civil infrastructure has already left more than 4 million people without access to pure drinking water. Soils in areas of military conflict are no longer fit for agriculture, because plants draw up and accumulate the pollutants. 
 
War also poses threats of nuclear accidents. Power shortages at nuclear plants and fights in vicinity of stations may result in disasters like in Chernobyl
or Fukushima. Military emissions of  reach hundreds of million tonnes and undermine goals of the Paris Agreement.
 
More than 12 thousand square kilometres of Ukraine's nature reserves have become a war zone. Populations of rare endemic and migrant species suffered great losses, birds were forced to abandon nests and change usual migration routes. Efforts of decades-long conservation projects were ruined.
 
An estimation of the total environmental damage inflicted by the war would be possible only after its active phase. According to preliminary data, it will take Ukraine's nature at least 15 years to recover.

War damage to nature

Environmental damage caused by war can last for centuries. According to studies, soils near Ypres in Belgium still contain more than 2,000 metric tons of copper after World War I. In Iran, soils are still contaminated with mercury and chlorine after fights during the Iranian Revolution. In 2018 in Kabul more than 3,000 people died from diseases attributable to air pollution that happened since 1978. The First and Second Chechen War left more than 30% of soils in Chechnya unsuitable for agriculture.

Depending on soil pH and access of oxygen and water, it takes from 100 to 300 years for ammunition to degrade. Destroyed cities pose a huge ecological threat because undetonated bombs are buried in debris, ruined houses release cancerogenic dust (sometimes for decades), millions of tonnes of generated rubble are almost impossible to recycle. Forced mass relocation of people overload infrastructure of host regions. Refugee camps accumulate waste and have almost no recycling facilities.

In 2014, it cost approximately 2.5 euros to plant a mine in Ukraine, while to clear it cost more than 900 euros. Lots of research is required to fully estimate the environmental damage caused by the Russian invasion, though this impossible to be done until a complete ceasefire. As of June 2022, Ukraine's Ministry of Envinronment estimates the cost at 6.6 bln euro. The so-called carbon 'bootprint' of this war is counted in millions of tonnes and undermines efforts towards  emissions reduction.

Direct pollution 

After the first two weeks of hostilities air probes in Kyev showed pollutant concentrations 27 higher than normal. Explosions, destructed armor and vehicles, burning and spilled fuel pollute air, water, and soils. Explosion of every bomb releases particles of heavy metals, formaldehydes, nitrous oxide, hydrogen cyanide, and toxic organic compounds. These pollutants are spread by winds and underground waters, that's why the hazardous ecological impact of war will directly affect Russia and Europe. The explosives release chemicals compounds that are oxidized on air and may cause acidic rains. They can 'burn' vegetation and respiratory organs of mammals (including humans).

Modern ammunition for 95-97% is made of lead, the rest are zinc, nickel, barium, manganese, copper, antimony, etc. Sometimes it contains depleted uranium. Lead is highly toxic and highly penetrable, it enters human body not only with air or water, but also through skin and hair. Prolonged exposure to lead causes kidney failure, and even short-term contact affects the nervous system and induce encephalopathy, as well as anemia, loss of coordination and memory. Similar neurotoxic effects are registered in animals.

Particles of depleted uranium are 100 times smaller than leukocytes and easily bypass the blood-brain barries, they directly reach the olfactory nerves and disrupt cognitive and thinking processes. Antimony causes inflammation of cardiovascular, respiratory and digestive systems. Nickel also hurts the immune system. Exposure to high concentrations of copper, marganese and zinc can have a poisonous effect and induce pneumonia, pulmonary fibrosis, and lethargy. Microparticles of destroyed ammo shells get into water and penetrate human and animals' bodies through food chain.

Explosives, such as TNT, DNT, and RDX, cause chemical pollution and induce acute intoxication and long-term mutagenic effects in people. TNT is easily absorbed through skin and mucous membranes. Depending on the dose, its cancerogenic effects can induce alopecia, anemia, liver failure, cataract, and change blood composition. Hexogen poisoning causes nausea and anemia, prolonged exposure leads to kidney and liver failure. DNT is also toxic, in high doses it can disrupt cardiovascular system and provoke oncology. Explosion of one BM-21 Grad releases more than 500 gr of sulfur that reacts with water and turns into sulfurous acid. War-damaged land is 'burned' with acid, not with usual fire.

According to The Pentagon, by July 2022 at least 1200 rockets and bombs exploded in Ukraine. In the first days of the invasion, the Russian army bombed ammunition depots located near urban areas. Toxic clouds raised after the massive explosions and fires covered residential districts and villages; a severe damage to health of the locals may be the result. The infamous 'Pančevo cancer' is an example of such exposure — a spike of oncology is registered among Pančevo 1999 bombing survivors. Many scientists are sure that toxic damage caused by hostilities is even more hazardous to human population than explosions.

According to Russian journalist Yulia Latynina, the toxic fuel of malfunctioning air-launched cruise missiles from Russian bombers Tu-95 and Tu-160 deployed over Caspian Sea during the invasion caused the mass die-off of Caspian seals in 2022. According to this version, some missiles fail to launch due to their old age and fall down. To avoid their accidental falls on land, launches are made over water. Since the start of the invasion several mass die-offs of Caspian seals were recorded (such as in spring when between 31 March and 2 May 832 carcasses were found in Kazakhstan's Mangystau Region and in summer when 837 carcasses were found on Kazakhstan's coast).

Bombing of industrial sites 

Eastern Ukraine is a highly industrialized area with more than 900 facilities and production centres, including coal mines, oil refineries, chemical labs, steel plants, etc. By CEOBS estimation, more than 10 mln tonnes of toxic waste and tailings are stored in this region. Direct hits and explosions result in leakages of hazardous materials that poison air, water, and soils. Accidents at high-risk industrial sites can escalate in 'domino effect' and cause disastrous thermal, hydro, and chemical discharges.

As of April 1, 2022, more than 36 attacks were registered on fossil fuel infrastructure, 29 attacks on electricity stations, 7  — on water infrastructure, and 6 on nuclear sites. More than 60 fires happened on Ukraine's oil refineries by June 2022. Accidents at huge industrial enterprises such as Azovstal, Lysychansk Oil Refinery, or  could lead to disastrous environmental damage. Thankfully, Azovstal initiated a program of environmentally safe shutdown in the very first week of the Russian invasion. Coke ovens were stopped, the temperature was lowered, and liquid glass was poured in to prevent the coking process from continuing and the coke oven gas to be released as intensively as possible On February 25, chemical reagents were disposed. An attack on Lysychansk refinery ignited the 50,000 tonnes tank of oil sludge, two reservoirs with 20,000 tonnes of petroleum, and a sulphur store.

The number of attacks on industrial centres made international observers and Ukrainian government identify them as ecocide. For instance, on March 21 ammonia reservoirs at Sumykhimprom were hit. The resulted leakage covered an area 2.5 km in radius, people of Novoselitsy village were told to hide in shelters. On April 5 and 9, nitric acid tanks were blown in Rubizhne, the police of the Donetsk People's Republic and Ukrainian army laid charges for the attack on each other. On April 4, 2022, a Russian rocket was shot down in Kremenets region, the debris fell onto a farm and hit reservoirs with organic fertilizers, causing leakage. Though the tanks were nearly empty, the spill was enough to poison the local river Ikva. In a few days, the probes of water showed ammonia concentration 163 higher above safety level, dead fish were reported on its banks. On May 31, in Severodonetsk district a tank with nitric acid was blown, a chemical cloud forced locals to hide in shelters. As of June 2022, Ukrainian observers registered more than 2000 cases of environmental damage caused by hostilities.

Forced migration is another risk caused by the war because without human control even out of service industrial sites may be hazardous. Most plants and industrial sites in East Ukraine were built in Soviet times, by now the infrastructure is significantly worn-out. For instance, at  there are two ponds of toxic waste one of which has a damb that has been identified as unstable in 2019. In case of a breakthrough, 8 mln tonnes of chemical waste will pour onto the surrounding lands and the Zalizna river, poisoning all water sources in the region, and reaching Seversky Donets that brings its waters to Russia.

Coal mines throughout eastern Ukraine have deteriorated rapidly, as active and expanded hostilities have made it difficult for maintenance projects to continue. The potential for pollution of ground and surface water throughout the entire Donbas region has been reported. When a mine is flooded, radionuclides and toxic substances contaminate underground waters, poisoning water sources of local residential areas. Eurocommission specialists registered at least 35 abandoned coal mines in Donbass, including the 'YunKom Mine' which was used for a nuclear test in 1979. Waters of Komyshuvakha river turned orange in 2021 because of leakage from the abandoned 'Zolotoe' mine. Risks of a man-made disaster caused by the Russian invasion are growing with every day of the war. Worst-case scenario includes pollution of the Azov sea with toxic waste.

Nuclear threats 

Ukraine is Europe's second-largest nuclear producer, almost 50% of electricity in the country come from nuclear power plants. Nuclear plants are vulnerable to direct hits, as well as of waste-sites. Apart from direct attacks, man-made disasters may happen because of an operational mistake, power shortage, or connection issues. For instance, without electricity water cooling of nuclear reactors goes off causing their melt, like happened in Fukushima. Station's operators, working under siege in constant stress, are more prone to mistakes.

As early as February 24, 2022, the moving of heavy military vehicles raised nuclear dust and resulted in a spike of gamma radiation level in Chernobyl region 28 times higher than normal. Notably, local winds are mostly directed to Russia. Ukrainian authorities also accuse Russian army of arsons in the Chernobyl Exclusion Zone. According to different sources, from 15 to 37 hectares of forest were swept by fires.

In early March, hostilities reached Zaporizhzhia Nuclear Power Plant, the biggest in Europe and the world's fifth most powerful nuclear station. The amount of nuclear material equivalent on this site is comparable to 20 Chernobyls. On March 4, the fights led to a fire in an auxiliary building. On May 30, the IAEA reported that it had lost connection to servers of Zaporizhzhia plant. The connection was restored only on June 12.

Rafael Grossi raised concerns about the extremely stressful conditions faced by station's personnel. Under constant pressure by the Russian military, the employees were unable to rotate shifts with those colleagues who were outside the facility, and couldn't rest. Food and medicine shortages were also reported. Grossi emphasized that exhausted, stressed employees are more prone to mistakes. On June 30, the IAEA again lost connectivity to the station.

While wide attention was focused on nuclear reactors, potential damage to spent nuclear fuel reservoirs or storages of spent nuclear rods could be more devastating. For instance, more than 3000 spent fuel rods containers are stored on Zaporizhzhia plant under the open sky. At other stations, spent roads are kept in cooling tanks. If water in those tanks becomes warmer or leakes, the overheated rods will ignite. The consequences will be equivalent to the Kyshtym disaster. According to the IAEA, two Russian missiles have already hit nuclear waste ponds in Ukraine. In the meantime, spent nuclear fuel can release 20 times the fatal dose of radiation in one hour.

Damaged biologics systems

Fertile soils 

Fights and shelling ruin fertile soils in a long-term perspective. The highly fertile Ukrainian chernozem that makes it one of the world leaders in grain export suffers from pollution with heavy metals, chemicals, lubricants, and spent fuel. Vegetation, grown on contaminated land, absorb these pollutants and transfer them to humans via the food chain. According to UN estimation, in 2022 only in Donbass more than 530 ha are considered an area of ecological catastrophe.

Research indicates that chernozem is physically damaged by traffic of tanks and heavy vehicles: their weight makes the soil clump and stick together, in the meantime, earthworms and other animals that normally stir up and aerate soil get scared off by the noise. Communities of soil microbes are reduced at least for several years. To recover from tank traffic, wet soils need at least four years. Also, with a decrease of vegetation cover, pollutants penetrate easily and tend to go deeper into the ground.

Ecologists also mention that an abrupt suspension of agricultural use on fields leads to uncontrolled reproduction of rodent mice and weeds and brings additional hazards to human health.

Water sources 

Rivers and water bodies are strategically important objects. During fights, Dnieper, 
Donets, and Irpin serve as natural defences. The Black Sea also became a theatre of war. Destroyed and abandoned vehicles pollute water with leaking fuel and lubricants, fuel spills induce fires and ruin the chemical balance of water. Oil itself is highly toxic to marine wildlife and microorganisms, but also it contains hydrocarbons that dissolve polluters such as pesticides or heavy metals and lead to their concentration in the upper layers of water.

Dam destruction causes degradation of vast territories, as well as soil and water contamination. Thus, on February 26, 2022, a dam on Irpen river near  village was destroyed by Russian troops, resulting in a flood that covered more than 10 km and went up to Horenka. Biodiversity of the Gulf of Odesa, Danube Delta, and Azov Sea, is yet to be estimated.

The Seversky Donets river was in critical condition back in 2018. The river serves as a water source for all Donbass, but levels of heavy metals and alkylphenols in it were seven times higher than acceptable. In 2022, bombs destroyed Popasnyansky and Uzhnodonbassky waterways, 'Seversky Donets - Donbass' channel, and Donetskaya filtration plant was stopped several times due to power shortages. Untreated sewage runoff spilled into the river after pipeline ruptures. The hostilities destroyed the water infrastructure that served for 4 mln people and left them with no access to pure drinking water. Drinking polluted water affects inner organs, sometimes a week is enough to poison liver and cause death. Polluted waters go downstream and contaminate soils and underground water in Russia.

National parks and nature reserves 

 
Ukraine's national parks and reserves are a part of pan-European chain of protected sites titles 'the Emerald Network', they are a home to many endangered species. Preliminary assess showed that more than 1.24 mln (more than a third) ha of protected sites in Ukraine were affected by war. According to the Ukraine Nature Conservation Society, more than 44% of the most valuable natural areas of Ukraine are covered by war.

Direct damage is registered throughout the war: Russian troops has dug trenches in nature reserves, built fortifications, landed and exploded mines. In the Great Meadow National Nature Park Russian tanks moved through the fields of endangered spring meadow saffron that was a part of conservation program for 16 years. Fights near Kherson in the Black Sea Biosphere Reserve were so intense that the fires were seen from space. Scientists are concerned that if the hostilities go through summer, fires will spread to wast territories because of the lack of human and water resources to put them down.

Meotyda National Nature Park near Mariupol is a habitat and nesting place of many endangered birds, including the dalmatian pelican and the Pallas's gull. Fights in reserved forests of the Kinburn Spit lasted more than a week and caused irreparable damage to the local ecosystem. Dzharylhak National Nature Park, home to many rare endemic herbs and wild boars, foxes, and deers, became an active fighting zone, more than 56 km of its shores were planted with mines. Also, the war forced many inspectors and environmentalists to leave their workplaces, disrupting results of many decades-long conservation and biodiversity projects.

Animals and birds 

More than 70 thousand of flora and fauna species live in Ukraine, accounting for more than 35% of Europe's biodiversity. War directly affects local populations and also disrupts migration. Wild animals are killed by shelling and bombing; fires, explosions, and vibrations scare off the animals, force birds to leave their nests, disrupt food base. When forcing rivers, heavy vehicles pollute waters with fuel and lubricants that poison insect larvae. The lower their number, the fewer frogs there will be, meaning no food for cranes. Fights in spring, most species' breeding season, multiplied the damage.

During the Annexation of Crimea by the Russian Federation in 2014, Russian troops landed and moved through protected lands of the Krivaya Kosa nature reserve, instantly destroying nestings of the red book listed Pallas's gull. Because of the bombings, in 2022 only 300 Dalmatian pelicans instead of usual 1500 migrated through the Krivaya Kosa. Only in the first three months of the war, 200 bombs were dropped onto Tuzly Lagoons.

Conservationists of the Tuzly Lagoons National Nature Park led a 30-years project to restore the connection between coastal lagoons and the Black sea. The natural rivulets that serve as a migration route for billions of small fish to breeding areas were dried up by industrial agriculture. Every spring the employees dug shallow channels to substitute them. In 2022 the coast was landed with mines and the employees had to leave, no digging of channels meant no migration routes for fish, no food base for a 5000 population of herons, and a ruined ecosystem as the result.

Dolphins became one of the most affected species, hundred of dead animals were spotted along the shores of Ukraine, Turkey, Romania, and Bulgaria. Scientists assume that dolphins die from heavy metal poisoning, explosions, acoustic traumas and disorientation caused by unprecedented noise pollution from military sonars. mechanical injuries and burns were spotted on some of the bodies. Tuzly Parks's director Ivan Rusev estimates the number of dead dolphins at several thousand.

Domestic animals suffer as well. Before the war, there were more than 3.5 mln of cattle, 5.7 mln of pigs, and 212 mln of poultry in Ukraine. These farm animals are hard to relocate, that's why they are often abandoned by owners. Cats and dogs are more frequently taken in the evacuation by their owners, however, the most part if left in war affected areas. Sometimes, wildlife returns to the areas, deserted by humans. For instance, in Donetsk region populations of wolves, foxes, and wild dogs grew significantly after 2014. The side effect is that these species are frequent spreaders of rabies. A spike of cases is registered now among local people.

Indirect environmental impacts due to sanctions 

When the war started, most international foundations and organisations ceased partnerships with Russia in environmental projects, Arctic programs of global climate change effects were stopped. In Ukraine, almost all conservation projects were disrupted. Wildfires of 2021 in Turkey, Europe, and Siberia, were mostly extinguished by Russian military aircraft. However, in 2022 due to sanctions it is impossible to contract. Even inside Russia, where usually the military help with wildfires, no spare aircraft is left because of the war. In combination with an unprecedented heatwave, it can lead to disastrous consequences.

Energy transition 
The war in Ukraine may possibly fasten the energy transition. In March 2022, Europe paid Russia approximately 640 mln euros daily for oil and gas, the country's revenues from hydrocarbon exports accounted for more than 40% of its budget. UN secretary António Guterres urges all nations to "to put the pedal to the metal towards a renewable energy future." and calls trying to fill fossil fuel supply gap with gas and coal a "mutually assured destruction". Many experts agree that a switch to sustainable energy sources may be more swift and cost-effective than, for instance, building of new gas pipelines and terminals.

Meanwhile, some are sceptical and almost sure that this war will disrupt all efforts towards Paris agreement goals.  emissions will increase of some governments decide to replace Russian fossil fuels with import from other countries and fill the gap with coal energy. Building new supply chains, new logistics and infrastructure in attempt to replace Russian hydrocarbons will almost surely lock the world into irreversible warming.

Environmental legislation 

After February 24, 2022, many potentially hazardous amends were made to the Russian environmental law. For example, construction is now permitted in nature reserves, emissions norms are decreased, Russian car manufacturers are now allowed to produce models regardless of European eco standards, and an environmental impact assessment will not be needed from businesses in the next two years. The state program 'Clean Air' was also postponed for two years.

Cleaning after war-related pollution is a difficult task, it depends on many factors such as soil pH, microorganisms' activity, local temperature, etc.
 
The Ukrainian government addresses this war-related environmental destruction as an 'ecocide'. This term was formalised in the state Criminal Code. The Ukrainian officials state that they are planning to gain the support of the international community to make Russia pay for reconstruction and recovery.

See also 
 Environmental impact of war
 War and environmental law
 Climate Change 2022: Impacts, Adaptation & Vulnerability (UN IPCC AR6 WGII & WGIII reports)

References 
 Notes

 References

Sources 
 
 
 
 
 
 
 
 

Impacts of the 2022 Russian invasion of Ukraine
2022
Ukraine